This is a list of notable of visual artists from, or associated with, Chile.

A
 Arturo Pacheco Altamirano (1903–1978), painter
 Graciela Aranis (1908-1996), painter
 Claudia Aravena (born 1968), artist, curator, filmmaker, and professor
 Ximena Armas (born 1946), painter

B
 José Balmes (1927–2016), painter
 Gracia Barrios (1927-2020), painter
 Catalina Bauer (born 1976), visual artist
Joan Belmar (born 1970), visual artist
 Samy Benmayor (born 1956), painter
 Claudio Bravo (1936–2011), hyper-realism painter
 Roser Bru (1923–2021), painter and engraver
 Pablo Burchard (1875–1964), painter

C 
 Celia Castro (1860–1930), painter
 Carlos Catasse (1944-2010), painter 
 Santos Chávez (1934–2001), printmaker
 Marta Colvin (1907–1995), sculptor
 Adolfo Couve (1940–1998), artist and writer
 Eugenio Cruz Vargas (1923–2014),  painter and poet

D 
 Juan Davila (born 1946), artist
 Emma Formas de Dávila (1883–1959), painter
 Marcela Donoso (born 1961), painter
 Juan Downey (1940–1993), video artist

E
 José Tomás Errázuriz (1856–1927), landscape painter and diplomat
 Virginia Errázuriz (born 1941), painter

F
 Freddy Flores Knistoff (1948–), painter and writer

G
 Lily Garafulic (1914–2012), sculptor
 Teresa Gazitúa (born 1941), painter
 Álvaro Guevara (1894–1951), painter
Liliana Wilson Grez (born 1953), painter

H
 Laila Havilio (born 1960), sculptor

J
 Onofre Jarpa (1849–1940), painter
 Guillermo Jullian de la Fuente (1931–2008), architect and painter

L
 Pedro Lira (1845–1912), painter

M 
 Roberto Matta (1911–2002), painter 
 Rebeca Matte (1875–1929), sculptor
 Mariana Matthews (born 1946), photographer, curator, and visual artist
 Carlos Maturana (born 1953), artist 
 Elmina Moisan (1897-1938), painter 
 Camilo Mori (1896–1973), painter 
 Pedro Olmos Muñoz (1911-1991), painter

O
 Manuel Ortiz de Zárate (1887–1946), painter

P
Catalina Parra (born 1940), photomontage artist
 Matilde Pérez (1916–2014), kinetic artist
 Henriette Petit (1894-1983), painter
 Christiane Pooley (born 1983), visual artist
 Dora Puelma (1898-1972), Chilean painter, sculptor

R
 Laura Rodig (1901-1972) painter, sculptor, illustrator, educator
 José Manuel Ramírez Rosales (1804–1877), painter and entrepreneur
 Alejandra Ruddoff (born 1960), sculptor

S
 Cosme San Martín (1850–1906), painter and art teacher
 Kamal Siegel (born 1978), digital artist
 Pablo Siebel (born 1954), painter
 Carlos Sotomayor (1911-1988), Cubist painter 
 Francisca Sutil (born 1952), painter

V
 Cecilia Vicuña (born 1948)
 Ramón Subercaseaux Vicuña (1854–1937), painter and diplomat

See also
 List of Chilean women artists
 List of Latin American artists
 Culture of Chile
 Chilean art

References

 
Chilean
Artists